The Mediterranean rainbow wrasse (Coris julis) is a small, colourful fish in the family Labridae. It can be found in the Mediterranean Sea and in the northeast Atlantic Ocean from Sweden to Senegal (though it is a rare wanderer to the southern British Isles). Records of this species south from Senegal and the Cape Verde Islands are actually the closely related Coris atlantica.

It feeds on amphipods, isopods, sea urchins, polychaete, shrimps, and small gastropods.

Description

Like many wrasses, C. julis is a sequential hermaphrodite: all start in the smaller initial phase. These initial-phase individuals (both females and males) can turn into the larger secondary-phase males. There is a marked difference in the appearance of the two phases. In the Mediterranean Sea, the secondary-phase male is green, blue, or brown, with white belly, a dark blue spot over the ventral fin, and a bright orange band on the side, while the smaller primary-phase females and males are brown with yellowish sides and white bellies. Populations in the Atlantic differ in colour and genetics from the Mediterranean population, but are maintained in a single species at present. If found to be separate, the scientific name Coris festiva (at present considered a synonym of C. julis) is available for the Atlantic population.

Habitat
It is typically found near the shore in places with seagrass or rocks.

References

External links
 

Mediterranean rainbow wrasee
Fish of the Mediterranean Sea
Fish of the Black Sea
Fish of the East Atlantic
Marine fauna of West Africa
Mediterranean rainbow wrasse
Taxa named by Carl Linnaeus